George Baron Bockelberg (12 December 1890 – 10 October 1971) was an Australian politician. A farmer, he served in the Australian Imperial Force during World War I at Gallipoli and the Western Front. In 1956 he was elected to the South Australian House of Assembly as the Liberal and Country League member for Eyre. He held the seat until his retirement in 1968.

References

 

1890 births
1971 deaths
Liberal and Country League politicians
Members of the South Australian House of Assembly
Australian Army soldiers
Place of birth missing
Australian farmers
20th-century Australian politicians